The rufous-gaped hillstar (Urochroa bougueri), formerly included in the white-tailed hillstar, is a species of hummingbird in the "brilliants", tribe Heliantheini in subfamily Lesbiinae. It is found in Colombia and Ecuador.

Taxonomy
The rufous-gaped hillstar was formally described in 1851 by the French ornithologist Jules Bourcier based on a specimen that he had collected in Ecuador. He placed it in the genus Trochilus and coined the binomial name Trochilus bougueri. The species is now placed in the genus Urochroa that was introduced in 1856 by the English ornithologist John Gould. The genus name combines the Ancient Greek oura meaning "tail" with khroa meaning "colour" or "complexion". The specific epithet bougueri was chosen to honour the French mathematician Pierre Bouguer who had visited Peru in 1736–1742.

The rufous-gaped hillstar and what is now the green-backed hillstar (Urochroa leucura) were once treated as a single species, the "white-tailed hillstar". They are the only two members of their genus. Although they share the name "hillstar" with the members of genus Oreotrochilus, they are quite different and not closely related. The rufous-gaped hillstar is monotypic.

Description

It weighs . The sexes are alike. They have a long, straight, black bill and coppery green upperparts. The English name comes from the rufous-cinnamon malar streak on the face. The throat and breast are iridescent blue and the belly dull gray. The central and outermost tail feathers are black and the rest white with dusky gray edges. Juveniles are similar to adults with the addition of buffy fringes on the head feathers.

What is thought to be the rufous-gaped hillstar's song is "a continuous series of single 'swit' or 'tsit' notes". It also makes "a liquid 'twit', repeated in long sequences when alarmed."

Distribution and habitat
The rufous-gaped hillstar is found on the Pacific slope of the Andes from Colombia's Chocó Department south into Ecuador as far as Pichincha Province. It inhabits the interior and edges of mature montane forest and secondary forest, and also shrubby slopes, and is often found near streams. Though the rufous-gaped hillstar is generally sedentary, it makes some seasonal elevational movements, at least in Colombia.

Behavior

Feeding
The rufous-gaped hillstar usually forages in the lower and middle strata of the forest but occasionally in the canopy. Males defend feeding territories at stands of flowering vegetation. It takes nectar mostly from plants of genera Inga, Bomarea, Psammisia, and Cavendishia. In addition to feeding on nectar it captures small insects by hawking from a perch.

Breeding
The rufous-gaped hillstar's breeding season in Colombia spans from December to March; it has not been documented in Ecuador. The female incubates the clutch of two eggs for 16 to 18 days; fledging occurs 23 to 25 days after hatch.

Status
The IUCN has assessed the rufous-gaped hillstar as being of Least Concern, though its population size and trend are unknown. No immediate threats have been identified. It is considered uncommon to rare in Ecuador and fairly common in Colombia, and occurs in at least two protected areas in the latter.

References

rufous-gaped hillstar
Birds of the Ecuadorian Andes
rufous-gaped hillstar
Taxonomy articles created by Polbot